Moses Oloya (born 22 October 1992) is a Ugandan professional footballer who plays as a midfielder for Vietnamese club Hải Phòng.

Early and personal life
Oloya's brother is Jimmy Kidega, who also played international football for Uganda.

Club career
Oloya has played club football in Uganda, Vietnam and Russia for Kampala Capital City Authority, Xuan Thanh Sai Gon, Becamex Binh Duong, Kuban Krasnodar and Hanoi FC.

He signed for Haiphong for the 2022 season.

International career
He made his international debut for Uganda in 2011, and has appeared in FIFA World Cup qualifying matches. He was a member of Uganda's squad at the 2017 Africa Cup of Nations.

International career statistics

References

1992 births
Living people
Ugandan footballers
Uganda international footballers
Kampala Capital City Authority FC players
Xuan Thanh Saigon Cement FC players
Becamex Binh Duong FC players
FC Kuban Krasnodar players
Hanoi FC players
V.League 1 players
Association football midfielders
Ugandan expatriate footballers
Ugandan expatriate sportspeople in Vietnam
Expatriate footballers in Vietnam
Ugandan expatriate sportspeople in Russia
Expatriate footballers in Russia
2017 Africa Cup of Nations players
Haiphong FC players
Sportspeople from Kampala